†Partulina montagui was a species of tropical air-breathing land snail, a terrestrial pulmonate gastropod mollusk in the family Achatinellidae. This species was endemic to Hawaii, in the United States.

References 

Partulina
Extinct gastropods
Gastropods described in 1850
Taxonomy articles created by Polbot